Lisbon is a city in and the county seat of Ransom County, North Dakota, United States. 
The population was 2,204 at the 2020 census.

History

Lisbon was founded in 1880 by Joseph L. Colton, who named the new city after Lisbon, New York, his wife's hometown, not after Portugal's capital.  Within four years, the town had a newspaper, the Star.

Picnickers in Sandager Park can often watch canoeists paddle by on the Sheyenne.  Camping is available in Sandager Park and five miles south of the city in Dead Colt Creek Recreation Area.  Pioneer Lisbon newspaper publisher W.D. Boyce is credited with importing the concept for the Boy Scouts from England to the United States.  The verdant campus of the North Dakota Veterans Home, established in 1891, provides retirement living for military veterans. Construction is underway for a large new facility adjacent to the current one.

Downtown Lisbon is home to the Scenic movie theater, which was established in 1911. The Scenic is the oldest, continuously running theater in the United States. During the COVID-19 pandemic in 2020, the theater remained open by providing outdoor showings.

Geography and climate

Lisbon is located at  (46.439141, −97.683520).

Lisbon is at the intersection of State Highways 27 (5th Avenue) and 32 (Main Street).

Demographics

2010 census
As of the census of 2010, there were 2,154 people, 966 households, and 531 families living in the city. The racial makeup of the city was 97.0% White, 0.5% African American, 0.5% Native American, 0.6% Asian, 0.1% Pacific Islander, 0.2% from other races, and 1.1% from two or more races. Hispanic or Latino of any race were 1.3% of the population.

There were 966 households, of which 26.0% had children under the age of 18 living with them, 45.1% were married couples living together, 6.8% had a female householder with no husband present, 3.0% had a male householder with no wife present, and 45.0% were non-families. 41.5% of all households were made up of individuals, and 21.8% had someone living alone who was 65 years of age or older. The average household size was 2.09 and the average family size was 2.86.

The median age in the city was 46.4 years. 21.9% of residents were under the age of 18; 5.4% were between the ages of 18 and 24; 20.6% were from 25 to 44; 28.8% were from 45 to 64; and 23.3% were 65 years of age or older. The gender makeup of the city was 50.3% male and 49.7% female.

2000 census
As of the census of 2000, there were 2,292 people, 948 households, and 571 families living in the city. The population density was 1,019.7 people per square mile (393.3/km2). There were 1,017 housing units at an average density of 452.4 per square mile (174.5/km2). The racial makeup of the city was 98.65% White, 0.04% African American, 0.39% Native American, 0.26% Asian, and 0.65% from two or more races. Hispanic or Latino of any race were 0.44% of the population.

There were 948 households, out of which 29.1% had children under the age of 18 living with them, 52.1% were married couples living together, 6.2% had a female householder with no husband present, and 39.7% were non-families. 37.6% of all households were made up of individuals, and 20.3% had someone living alone who was 65 years of age or older. The average household size was 2.19 and the average family size was 2.90.

In the city, the population was spread out, with 21.9% under the age of 18, 6.2% from 18 to 24, 23.7% from 25 to 44, 21.6% from 45 to 64, and 26.7% who were 65 years of age or older. The median age was 44 years. For every 100 females, there were 104.8 males. For every 100 females age 18 and over, there were 100.4 males.

The median income for a household in the city was $38,024, and the median income for a family was $47,566. Males had a median income of $36,917 versus $18,315 for females. The per capita income for the city was $18,757. About 0.3% of families and 4.7% of the population were below the poverty line, including 0.8% of those under age 18 and 8.4% of those age 65 or over.

References

External links
 Lisbon, ND
 The history of Lisbon: a one-hundred-year-old city located in the beautiful Sheyenne River Valley of Southeastern North Dakota (1980) from the Digital Horizons website
 Lisbon, North Dakota (1974) from the Digital Horizons website
 Lisbon, North Dakota: community fact survey (1965) from the Digital Horizons website

Cities in North Dakota
Cities in Ransom County, North Dakota
County seats in North Dakota
Populated places established in 1880
1880 establishments in Dakota Territory